"Hikky Burr" was the Grammy-nominated theme song for The Bill Cosby Show, and was also released as a well-known single in 1969. It was written and performed by Quincy Jones and Bill Cosby. It is known for its nonsense lyrics. It is on the album Smackwater Jack.  "Hikky Burr" was featured on the album The Original Jam Sessions 1969, and on The Best of Bill Cosby: 20th Century Masters Millennium Collection.

References

Comedy television theme songs
1969 songs
Quincy Jones songs
Songs written by Quincy Jones